Are You Sure? may refer to:

 Are You Sure? (The Allisons song)
Are You Sure? (Kris Kross Amsterdam song)
"Are You Sure", song written by Ike Cargill (1943), sung by The Staple Singers on Freedom Highway